The Flommen Ladies Open was a women's professional golf tournament on the Swedish Golf Tour, played between 2017 and 2019. It was always held at Flommen Golf Club in Falsterbo, Sweden.

Winners

References

Swedish Golf Tour (women) events